The 2011 PBA Governors Cup Finals was the best-of-7 championship series of the 2011 PBA Governors Cup, and the conclusion of the conference's playoffs. The Petron Blaze Boosters defeated the Talk 'N Text Tropang Texters in seven games to win their 19th Philippine Basketball Association (PBA) championship and prevented Talk 'N Text from winning the Grand Slam. Arwind Santos was named the Finals MVP.

Background

Road to the finals

*+10 in overall point differential over Alaska's +5 and Barangay Ginebra's −15
**+13 in overall point differential over Alaska's +6 and Barangay Ginebra's −19
The Talk 'N Text Tropang Texters were the first team to clinch a Finals berth after defeating the Barangay Ginebra Kings on July 31 with a game to spare. The Petron Blaze Boosters, which will advance to the Finals with a win over Talk 'N Text and a Ginebra win over the Rain or Shine Elasto Painters, blew out the Texters on August 5, while Ginebra defeated Rain or Shine on the following game. Petron was tied for second place with Ginebra and the Alaska Aces but advanced due to a superior quotient. However, several fans were dismayed over the quotient system, arguing that playoff games should have been held instead of determining finalists via the quotient system. Petron were seen as the underdog in the Finals as they had lost four key players to injuries while Talk 'N Text has a deep lineup.

Talk 'N Text, which has won the first two championships of the season, is seeking to win the first Grand Slam since 1996 PBA season when the Alaska won all three conference championships.

Series summary

Game 1

Talk 'N Text was leading by a point when they turned the ball over on an inbound pass. Petron's Arwind Santos, who had 12 points in the game, stole the ball and passed it to Danny Ildefonso in a fastbreak attempt. Ildefonso scored on a lay-up to give Petron the lead with 17.4 seconds remaining. On their offensive set, Jimmy Alapag found Ryan Reyes underneath the basket who scored with 10.1 seconds left. Anthony Grundy waited for the final seconds then was doubled; he passed the ball to Ildefonso who scored a 15-foot jump shot to give Petron an upset Game 1 win. The highlight of the game was Mark Yee's foul on Anthony Grundy, when he grabbed Grundy's behind twice before the officials called for a foul.

Game 2

In a game held at Tubod, Lanao del Norte, Ali Peek and Mark Yee from Talk 'N Text and Petron's Jojo Duncil were ejected after figuring in a melee at the middle of the second quarter. Petron, which was leading up to that point, relinquished the lead and effectively lost the game in the third quarter when the Texters started a scoring run, thus tying the series at 1–all.

Game 3

Prior to the game, Petron's Arwind Santos was named Best Player of the Conference, while Rain or Shine's Arizona Reid was awarded as the Best Import. Santos nosed out Mark Caguioa, Jayson Castro, Sonny Thoss, James Yap and Solomon Mercado, while Reid's closest competitor was Alaska's Jason Forte.

Petron was leading 20–9 when Castro and Larry Fonacier scored majority of their points in the first half to help Talk 'N Text pull away. Castro scored 21 of his 23 points in the first half, while Fonacier scored all of his 16 points in the opening half. The Texters, who had a 67% field goal percentage, even led by 41 points at the beginning of the fourth quarter. Talk 'N Text coach Chot Reyes revealed in the post-game press conference that Petron coach Ato Agustin challenged him to a fistfight after the game. Agustin denied that he challenged Reyes to a fistfight but the Talk 'N Text coach insisted he heard Agustin challenging him.

Game 4

In the annual awards ceremony held prior to the game, Talk 'N Text's Jimmy Alapag defeated Petron's Arwind Santos in the Most Valuable Player race, while Petron's injured center Rabeh Al-Hussaini was named Rookie of the Year.

While at the first half, both teams never led by a big margin, Petron had a 31–8 run at the beginning of the third quarter to post their largest margin of the series at 84–58. In that run, Grundy scored 11 of his 16 points, meanwhile Alex Cabagnot scored 16 points in the game, while Santos scored 20 points, an improvement over his three-point performance in Game 3.

Game 5

Prior to the game, Jayson Castro was sidelined due to an injury to his medial collateral ligament (MCL). Petron led 47–38 at the first half, then maintaining the 11-point lead at halftime. Ryan Reyes and Jimmy Alapag had poor games, scoring eight points each while Scottie Reynolds only scored three points, while his Petron counterpart Anthony Grundy posted a game-high 26 points. Alapag, who had only two turnovers in the Finals, turned the ball over three times in the game.

Game 6

Prior to the game, Talk 'N Text reactivated their original import Maurice Baker, replacing Scottie Reynolds who had been ineffective against the Boosters.

Jayson Castro, who was earlier ruled out in the rest of the series due to an MCL injury, was fielded in by Talk 'N Text in a game-time decision. Castro hit his first six shots, ending the game with 19 points, six rebounds and six assists. Maurice Baker held Grundy to five points and a scoreless first half, while he scored 18 points to help the Texters tie the series for the final time.

Game 7

Petron had a 27–13 lead at the first period, with Dennis Miranda scoring the game's first seven points, followed by the rest of Petron's starting lineup to score all 28 first quarter points. In the second quarter, Ranidel de Ocampo and Maurice Baker scored nine and eight points respectively, to help cut the deficit to six at halftime. Baker scored on four free-throws: the first two after Jojo Duncil was called for flagrant foul, and another two from Sunday Salvacion's hard foul on the next play; the Texters had a chance to cut the lead even further but Santos denied de Ocampo's dunk at the buzzer. Talk 'N Text would not get close the rest of the way: the game was virtually won by Petron when Santos dunked in the final minute to post an eight-point lead, denying Talk 'N Text of a grand slam. Santos was named Finals MVP, and Agustin is the second coach to win a championship after being an MVP as a player, after Robert Jaworski.

Rosters

Note: Scottie Reynolds played for Talk 'N Text for Games 1 to 5. Maurice Baker, the team's import until the eliminations replaced him for Games 6 and 7.

Broadcast notes
The Finals series were the last PBA games produced by Solar Sports as TV5 Sports was awarded the broadcast rights for the 2011–12 season.

References

External links
PBA official website

2010–11 PBA season
2011
PBA Governors' Cup Finals 2011
San Miguel Beermen games
TNT Tropang Giga games
PBA Governors' Cup Finals